The Liga Profesional de Baloncesto (LPB) Exemplary Player of the Year is an award presented yearly to the player with the best behavior on and off the court in the Liga Profesional de Baloncesto (LPB) of Venezuela. Since 2012, this recognition has been awarded by a vote of the Technical Commission, whose current members are José Rafael Gómez, Julio Mogollón and Manuel Fuentes. LPB rules mandate that to be eligible for the prize, candidates must have demonstrated irreproachable behavior and must also have played at least 75% of the regular season games.

Winners

References

External links 
 LPB official site (in Spanish)

Basketball trophies and awards
Venezuelan awards